Mellerud is a locality and the seat of Mellerud Municipality, Västra Götaland County, Sweden. It had 3,750 inhabitants in 2010.

Sports 
 Melleruds IF, Swedish football club
 Åsebro IF, Swedish football club

References 

Populated places in Västra Götaland County
Populated places in Mellerud Municipality
Municipal seats of Västra Götaland County
Swedish municipal seats
Dalsland